This is a list of people burned after being deemed heretics by different Christian Churches. The list does not attempt to encompass the list of those executed by burning for other reasons (such as victims of witch hunts or other persecutions). 

The Catholic Encyclopedia states that "with the formal recognition of the Church by the State and the increase of ecclesiastical penalties proportioned to the increase of ecclesiastical offences, came an appeal from the Church to the secular arm for aid in enforcing the said penalties, which aid was always willingly granted [...] deviations from the Catholic Faith, were by the State made punishable in civil law and secular penalties were attached to them." Canon 3 of the ecumenical Fourth Council of the Lateran, 1215 required secular authorities to "exterminate in the territories subject to their jurisdiction all heretics" pointed out by the Catholic Church, resulting in the inquisitor executing certain people accused of heresy.  Some laws allowed the civil government to employ punishment.

Pre-Reformation Roman Catholic Europe 

 Ramihrdus of Cambrai (1076 or 1077) (lynched)
 Peter of Bruys († 1130) (lynched)
 Gerard Segarelli († 1300)
 Fra Dolcino († 1307) (never tried by Catholic Church), Italy
 Marguerite Porete († 1310), Paris, France
 Botulf Botulfsson († 1311), the only known person executed for heresy in Sweden
 Jacques de Molay (1243–1314), burned after conviction by a tribunal under the control of King Philip IV of France, Paris, France
 Geoffroi de Charney († 1314), burned with Jacques de Molay above, Paris, France.
 Guilhèm Belibasta († 1321), last Cathar, Villerouge-Termenès, France
 Cecco d'Ascoli († 1327), Florence, Italy
 Na Prous Boneta († 1328)
 William Sawtre († 1401), Smithfield, London, England
 John Badby († 1410), Smithfield, London, England
 Jan Hus (1371–1415), Constance, Germany
 Jerome of Prague (1365–1416)
 William Taylor († 1423), Smithfield, London, England
 Joan of Arc (1412–1431), Trial of Joan of Arc, Rouen, France
 Thomas Bagley († 1431), Smithfield, London, England
 Pavel Kravař († 1433)
 Joan Boughton († 1494), Smithfield, London, England
 Girolamo Savonarola, Domenico da Pascia, and Silvestro Maruffi(† 1498), Florence, Italy (hanged and then burned)

Roman Catholic countries 

 Ipswich Martyrs († 1515–1558)
 Jean Vallière († 1523), Paris, France
 Jan de Bakker († 1525), 1st martyr in the Northern Netherland
 Wendelmoet Claesdochter († 1527), 1st Dutch woman charged and burned for the accusation of heresy
 Michael Sattler († 1527), Rottenburg am Neckar, Germany
 Patrick Hamilton († 1528), St Andrews, Scotland
 Balthasar Hubmaier (1485–1528), Vienna, Austria
 George Blaurock (1491–1529), Klausen, Tyrol
 Thomas Hitton († 1530), Maidstone, England
 Richard Bayfield († 1531), Smithfield, England
 Thomas Benet († 1531), Exeter, England
 Thomas Bilney († 1531), Norwich, England 
 Joan Bocher († 1531), Smithfield, England
 Solomon Molcho († 1532), Mantua
 Thomas Harding († 1532), Chesham, England
 James Bainham († 1532), Smithfield, England
 John Frith (1503–1533), Smithfield, England
 William Tyndale (1490–1536), Belgium
 Jakob Hutter († 1536), Innsbruck, Tyrol
 Aefgen Listincx († 1538), Münster, Germany
 John Forest († 1538), Smithfield, England
 Katarzyna Weiglowa († 1538), Poland
 Anneke Esaiasdochter († 1539), The Netherlands
 Francisco de San Roman († 1540), Spain
 Étienne Dolet (1509–1546), Paris, France
 Henry Filmer († 1543), Windsor, England
 Robert Testwood († 1543), Windsor, England
 Anthony Pearson († 1543), Windsor, England
 Maria van Beckum († 1544)
 Ursula van Beckum († 1544)
 Colchester Martyrs († 1545 to 1558), 26 people, Colchester, England
 George Wishart (1513–1546), St Andrews, Scotland
 John Hooper († 1555), Gloucester, England
 John Rogers († 1555), London, England
 Canterbury Martyrs († 1555–1558), c.40 people, Canterbury, England
 Laurence Saunders, (1519–1555), Coventry, England
 Rowland Taylor († 1555), Hadleigh, Suffolk, England
 Cornelius Bongey, († 1555), Coventry, England
 Dirick Carver, († 1555), Lewes, England
 Robert Ferrar († 1555), Carmarthen, Wales
 William Flower († 1555), Westminster, England
 Patrick Pakingham († 1555), Uxbridge, England
 Hugh Latimer (1485–1555), Oxford, England
 Robert Samuel († 1555), Ipswich, England

 Nicholas Ridley (1500–1555), Oxford, England
 John Bradford († 1555), London, England
 John Cardmaker († 1555), Smithfield, London, England 
 Robert Glover († 1555), Hertford, England
 Thomas Hawkes  († 1555), Coggeshall, England
 Thomas Tomkins († 1555), Smithfield, London, England
 Thomas Cranmer (1489–1556), Oxford, England 
 Stratford Martyrs († 1556), 11 men and 2 women, Stratford, London, England
 Guernsey Martyrs († 1556), 3 women, Guernsey, Channel Islands
 Joan Waste († 1556), Derby, England
 Bartlet Green († 1556), Smithfield, London, England
 John Hullier († 1556), Cambridge, England
 John Forman († 1556), East Grinstead, England
 Pomponio Algerio († 1556)  Boiled in oil, Rome
 Alexander Gooch and Alice Driver († 1558), Ipswich, England

 Augustino de Cazalla († 1559), Valladolid, Spain
 Carlos de Seso († 1559), Valladolid, Spain
 María de Bohórquez († 1559), Sevilla, Spain
 Pietro Carnesecchi († 1567) Florence, Italy
 Leonor de Cisneros († 1568), Valladolid, Spain
 Weyn Ockers († 1568), Netherlands
 Dirk Willems († 1569), Netherlands
 Anneke Ogiers († 1570), Netherlands
 Menocchio (1532–1599), Italy
 Giordano Bruno (1548–1600), Rome, Italy
 Fulgenzio Manfredi (1560 ca. - 1610) Rome, Italy
 Lucilio Vanini (Giulio Cesare Vanini) (1585–1619), Toulouse, France
 Caterina Tarongí († 1691)
 Kimpa Vita (1684–1706), Angola
 Maria Barbara Carillo (1625–1721), Madrid, Spain
 Gertrude Cordovana († 1724), Palermo, Italy
 Ana de Castro († 1736)
 Abraham ben Abraham († 1749), Vilna, Polish–Lithuanian Commonwealth
 María de los Dolores López († 1781), Seville, Spain

Protestant countries 

 Robert Barnes († 1540), Smithfield, England
 Thomas Gerrard († 1540), Smithfield, England 
 Anne Askew (1521–1546), Smithfield, England 
 John Lascelles († 1546), Smithfield, England
 John Adams († 1546), Smithfield, England
 Joan Bocher († 1550), Smithfield, England 
 George van Parris († 1551), Smithfield, England 
 Matthew Hamont († 1579), Norwich, England 
 Francis Kett († 1589), Norwich, England
 Bartholomew Legate (1575–1612), Smithfield, England
 Edward Wightman (1566–1612), relapsed heretic, Lichfield, England
 Michael Servetus (1511–1553), Geneva, Switzerland
 Stephen Cotton († 1558), Brentford, England
 Nicolas Antoine (1602–1632), Geneva, Switzerland

Eastern Orthodox countries 

 Basil the Physician († 1118), by Emperor Alexius I Comnenus; heresy
 Avvakum Petrovich (1620–1682), by Tsar Feodor III of Russia; combating the Starovery movement
 Quirinus Kuhlmann († 1689), by Tsar Ivan V of Russia; considered politically dangerous

See also 
 List of people executed for witchcraft
 Forty Martyrs of England and Wales
 List of Catholic martyrs of the English Reformation

References

External links
 Foxe's book of Martyrs Retrieved 27 February 2013

Burned for heresy
People executed by burning